Carmelo Pujia (5 October 1927 – 8 January 2022) was an Italian politician. A member of the Christian Democracy party, he served as president of the Province of Catanzaro from 1970 to 1975 and in the Chamber of Deputies from 1983 to 1994. He died in Rome on 8 January 2022, at the age of 94.

References

1927 births
2022 deaths
Members of the Chamber of Deputies (Italy)
Christian Democracy (Italy) politicians
People from Calabria